Naci Tınaz (1882 in Serfiçe (Servia) – November 25, 1964 in Istanbul) was an officer of the Ottoman Army and a general of the Turkish Army.

See also
List of high-ranking commanders of the Turkish War of Independence
List of General Commanders of the Gendarmerie of Turkey
List of Ministers of National Defence of Turkey

Sources

External links

1882 births
1964 deaths
Macedonian Turks
Republican People's Party (Turkey) politicians
Ministers of National Defence of Turkey
Deputies of Bursa
Deputies of Ankara
Ottoman Army officers
Turkish Army generals
General Commanders of the Gendarmerie of Turkey
Ottoman military personnel of the Italo-Turkish War
Ottoman military personnel of the Balkan Wars
Ottoman military personnel of World War I
Turkish military personnel of the Greco-Turkish War (1919–1922)
Ottoman Military Academy alumni
Ottoman Military College alumni
Recipients of the Medal of Independence with Red Ribbon (Turkey)
Burials at Turkish State Cemetery
People from Servia